Anthony Bourdain: Parts Unknown is an American travel and food show on CNN which premiered on April 14, 2013. In the show, Anthony Bourdain travels the world uncovering lesser-known places and exploring their cultures and cuisine. The show won twelve Primetime Emmy Awards out of 31 nominations, as well as a 2013 Peabody Award. The digital series Explore Parts Unknown, an editorial partnership with Roads & Kingdoms, won a Primetime Emmy Award for Outstanding Short Form Nonfiction or Reality Series. Parts Unknown aired the last collection of episodes on CNN in the autumn of 2018. The series finale, titled "Lower East Side" — bringing Bourdain's culinary travelogue full circle back to Bourdain's hometown of New York — aired November 11, 2018.

Bourdain was working on an episode of the show centered in Strasbourg, France, at the time of his death on June 8, 2018.

Episodes

Season 1 (2013)

Season 2 (2013)

Season 3 (2014)

Season 4 (2014)
Season 4 aired from September to December 2014.

Season 5 (2015)
Season 5 aired from April to June 2015.

Season 6 (2015)
Season 6 aired from September to November 2015.

Season 7 (2016)
Source: The season finale (Buenos Aires) was moved to Season 8 when its original broadcast was pre-empted by coverage of the Orlando nightclub shooting.

Season 8 (2016)
Season 8 aired from September to December 2016, and notably features an interview with U.S. president Barack Obama. Episode 8 (Buenos Aires) was originally scheduled as the Season 7 finale, but was pre-empted by coverage of the Orlando nightclub shooting.

Season 9 (2017)
Season 9 was broadcast from April to July 2017. The final two episodes were delayed one week when coverage of the attack near the Finsbury Park mosque pre-empted the June 18, 2017, broadcast.

Season 10 (2017)
Season 10 premiered on October 1, 2017. In the premiere, Bourdain traveled to Singapore. Other locations include the French Alps, Lagos, Pittsburgh, Sri Lanka, Puerto Rico, Seattle, and Southern Italy. On November 12, 2017, the show was pre-empted when Bourdain presented his documentary Jeremiah Tower, The Last Magnificent, exploring America's first celebrity chef.

Season 11 (2018)
Season 11 premiered on April 29, 2018, and took Bourdain on excursions to West Virginia, Uruguay, Newfoundland, Armenia, Hong Kong, Berlin, Louisiana, and Bhutan.

Season 12 (2018) 

On June 8, 2018, Bourdain was found dead by his friend and collaborator Éric Ripert of an apparent suicide by hanging in his room at Le Chambard hotel in Kaysersberg, France. They had been filming an episode in nearby Strasbourg.

In August 2018, CNN announced that it would broadcast a final season of the series, with a premiere date later set for September 23, 2018. As only one episode (which featured a trip to Kenya with W. Kamau Bell, host of fellow CNN docuseries United Shades of America) was fully completed before Bourdain's death, four of the season's episodes (on Manhattan's Lower East Side, Indonesia, Spain's mountainous Asturias region, and the Texas "Big Bend" area bordering Mexico) were completed using narration and additional interviews provided by guests who were featured in each episode, while the other two episodes will act as retrospectives focusing on the show's production, and a tribute to the impact of Bourdain's life. The episode shot in Alsace at the time of Bourdain's death was not aired; it would have featured scenes of Ripert showing Bourdain around sights and restaurants along the Franco-German border.

The closing credits of the final episode, which featured a tour of the Lower East Side of Manhattan, ran while a cover of the Johnny Thunders song "You Can't Put Your Arms Around a Memory" played. Prior to his death, Bourdain asked Parts Unknown music director Michael Ruffino to record a cover version for the show; the recording was not made until after Bourdain's death, and Ruffino asked Bourdain's daughter Ariane to contribute backing vocals.

Availability 

The series has not been released on DVD or Blu-ray. Besides being broadcast on CNN, the show has been made available on demand through cable on-demand services as well as from streaming video providers including HBO Max (in the United States) and Netflix (internationally). The series is also available for purchase on the iTunes Store, Vudu, and Amazon Video. CNN has also released the series as an audio-only podcast.

The show was shot in high definition, and made available for streaming in both standard definition and high definition.

Following the conclusion of the final season, a special edition collection of the entire series, featuring a Prime Cuts: Through The Years compilation has been made available for purchase on the iTunes Store. On May 27, 2020, with the launch of HBO Max, the entire series was made available for streaming, omitting the Prime Cuts episodes. Following the launch of CNN+ on March 29, 2022, the full episode library moved to that service, leaving HBO Max with only 8 episodes. Despite CNN+'s quick shut down just 30 days later, the full series has yet to return to HBO Max. On August 19, 2022, the full episode library began streaming on Discovery Plus as part of an extensive library of CNN shows that moved there following the shutdown of CNN+

Awards and nominations

References

External links
 
 

2013 American television series debuts
2018 American television series endings
CNN original programming
English-language television shows
Food travelogue television series